Ossolin may refer to the following places:
Ossolin, Masovian Voivodeship (east-central Poland)
Ossolin, Podlaskie Voivodeship (north-east Poland)
Ossolin, Świętokrzyskie Voivodeship (south-central Poland)